The Taui, also known as Kava part of its course, is a river in Khabarovsk Krai and Magadan Oblast, Russian Far East.

The river is a spawning ground for salmon and is part of the Magadan Nature Reserve. Its last stretch is navigable.

Course 

The Taui flows first southeastwards and then roughly eastwards along the Kava-Taui Plain (Кава-Тауйская равнина), a wide floodplain. In its last stretch it enters an area of wetlands. Finally it flows into the Amakhton Bay, part of the Taui Bay of the Sea of Okhotsk. Its mouth lies west of the Arman lagoon and just southwest of the mouth of the Yana. The river freezes before mid October and stays frozen until mid May.

The Kheidzhan Range separates the Taui basin from the Inya basin to the west.

See also
List of rivers of Russia

References

External links
Floating Tours Down The Rivers of Magadan Region
Kolyma - Modern Guidebook to Magadan Oblast

Rivers of Magadan Oblast
Drainage basins of the Sea of Okhotsk